Shalva (lit. Security) is a moshav shitufi in southern Israel. Located in the southern Shephelah near Kiryat Gat, it falls under the jurisdiction of Shafir Regional Council.

History
The moshav was founded in 1952 by Jewish immigrants and refugees mostly from Libya, although some immigrants from Tunisia also joined it. Its name is taken from the book of Psalms 122:7: "be ... security within your towers."

References 

Moshavim
Populated places established in 1952
Populated places in Southern District (Israel)
1952 establishments in Israel
Libyan-Jewish culture in Israel
Tunisian-Jewish culture in Israel